Mihnea Chioveanu (born August 21, 1987 in Bucharest) is a Romanian water polo player. At the 2012 Summer Olympics, he competed for the Romania men's national water polo team in the men's event. He is 6 ft 6 inches tall.

References

Romanian male water polo players
1987 births
Living people
Olympic water polo players of Romania
Water polo players at the 2012 Summer Olympics
Water polo players from Bucharest